T. Damodaran (c. 1935 – 28 March 2012) was a screenwriter who predominantly worked in Malayalam cinema.

Life
Damodaran wrote the screenplays of films such as Angaadi (1980), Ahimsa (1981), John Jaffer Janardhanan (1982), Ee Nadu (1982), Iniyengilum (1983), Ithiri Poove Chuvanna Poove (1984), Vaartha (1986), Avanazhi (1986), 1921 (1988), Aryan (1988), Arhatha (1990), Inspector Balram (1990), Abhimanyu (1991), Adhwaytham (1992), Jackpot (1993) and Kaalapani (1996) among which the latter won four National Film Awards and seven Kerala State Film Awards.

As a writer and producer he frequently collaborated with directors such as I. V. Sasi and Priyadarshan. He also penned for the film Unaroo with director Maniratnam. His daughter, Deedi Damodaran, is also a screenwriter of Malayalam cinema. She made her debut with the film Gulmohar.

Selected filmography

References

External links

Malayalam-language writers
Writers from Kozhikode
Malayalam screenwriters
1930s births
2012 deaths
20th-century Indian dramatists and playwrights
21st-century Indian dramatists and playwrights
Screenwriters from Kerala